Peter the Tax-Collector (c. 527–565) is a saint in Eastern Orthodoxy. His life is commemorated on January 20.

External links
 Lives of the Saints, Orthodox Church in America
 Orthodox Calendar, Russian Orthodox Church
 Οriginal biography by John the Almsgiver (in Greek, with Spanish translation)

Eastern Orthodox saints